Norwegian law may refer to:

Norwegian Law (Israel), a law on the appointment of ministers and membership of the Knesset
Law of Norway, law in Norway